Berrouaghia is a town and commune in Médéa Province, Algeria. According to the 1998 census it has a population of 58,780.

Notable people
 Benyoucef Benkhedda - Algerian politician

History
Berrouaghia was during the Roman Empire called  Tanaramusa Castra. Tanaramusa was an  ancient Roman town that was the seat of an early Christian Bishopric, in North Africa.

References

Communes of Médéa Province